Damon Jamall Hollins (born June 12, 1974) is an American former professional baseball outfielder and current coach. Hollins played in Major League Baseball (MLB) for the  Atlanta Braves, Los Angeles Dodgers, and Tampa Bay Devil Rays. His only regular major league playing time was in Tampa Bay, where he manned all three outfield positions. He is currently the first base coach for the Kansas City Royals.

Early life
Hollins was born in Fairfield, California and grew up near Oakland–Alameda County Coliseum where he attended Oakland Athletics games as a child. He was the oldest child of his mother, Deborah Watson.

In 1991, Hollins played in the PONY Baseball and Softball Palomino World Series.

Hollins played baseball for Vallejo High School in Vallejo, California. He was drafted by the Atlanta Braves in the fourth round of the 1992 MLB Draft.

Professional career
Hollins began his professional career in the Gulf Coast League in 1992, the day after his high school graduation. In 1993, Baseball America ranked Hollins the best prospect in the Appalachian League.

Hollins made his Major League debut on April 24, 1998 at Turner Field, recording a hit against Brian Anderson of the Arizona Diamondbacks. He appeared in three games for the Braves that season before being traded to the Los Angeles Dodgers on September 9, 1998.

From 1999 to 2003, Hollins played in the minor league systems of the Cincinnati Reds, Milwaukee Brewers, Minnesota Twins and Braves. He briefly returned to the major leagues with the Braves in 2004. In 2005 and 2006, Hollins saw regular playing time for the first time in his career after joining the Tampa Bay Devil Rays.

On Mother's Day, May 14, 2006, Hollins was one of more than 50 hitters who brandished a pink bat to benefit the Susan G. Komen for the Cure.

On December 27, he signed with the Yomiuri Giants of Nippon Professional Baseball for the  season. Hollins played in 124 games, batted .257 with 12 home runs (2 of which were game-ending) and 45 RBI.

On December 22, 2009, Hollins signed a minor league contract with the Kansas City Royals.

Coaching career
Hollins became the hitting coach of the Burlington Royals in 2010. In 2011, he served as a coach with the Kane County Cougars. In 2012, he served as a coach with the Wilmington Blue Rocks. In 2013, Hollins was named the hitting coach of the Idaho Falls Chukars. He served in that role for two years before joining the Lexington Legends as a hitting coach in 2015. In 2019, in addition to serving as a coach for the Chukars, he was named an outfield, base running and bunting coordinator for the Kansas City Royals organization.

Prior to the 2020 season, Hollins was named the first base coach of the Royals, replacing Rusty Kuntz who opted out of the season due to COVID-19 concerns. When Kuntz returned to the team for the 2021 season, Hollins resumed his role as a minor league instructor. In November 2021, Hollins was named first base coach for the Royals for the 2022 season.

Personal life
In July 2006, Hollins' then-fiancée, Patrice, gave birth to their first child, a daughter named Tahari. , he and Patrice were married and living in Litchfield Park, Arizona with their three children.

References

External links
, or Retrosheet, or The Baseball Gauge, or Nippon Professional Baseball, or Venezuelan Professional Baseball League

1974 births
Living people
African-American baseball coaches
African-American baseball players
Águilas del Zulia players
American expatriate baseball players in Canada
American expatriate baseball players in Japan
Atlanta Braves players
Baseball coaches from California
Baseball players from California
Danville Braves players
Durham Bulls players
Edmonton Trappers players
Greenville Braves players
Gulf Coast Braves players
Indianapolis Indians players
Leones del Caracas players
American expatriate baseball players in Venezuela
Leones del Escogido players
American expatriate baseball players in the Dominican Republic
Los Angeles Dodgers players
Major League Baseball outfielders
Minor league baseball coaches
Omaha Royals players
People from Fairfield, California
Richmond Braves players
Tampa Bay Devil Rays players
Yomiuri Giants players
Sportspeople from Vallejo, California
21st-century African-American sportspeople
20th-century African-American sportspeople